Stephen Jagielka (10 March 1978 – 17 March 2021) was an English professional footballer who played as a midfielder.

Career
Having begun his career without success at Stoke City, Jagielka broke through at Shrewsbury Town, where he spent six seasons before falling out of favour under Jimmy Quinn as they were relegated to the Conference in 2003. He then moved to Sheffield United for a season, where despite the presence of his younger brother Phil and a good relationship with manager Neil Warnock, he did not play a first-team match. Jagielka then spent two seasons at Accrington Stanley, contributing to their promotion to the Football League as Conference champions in 2006.

Jagielka subsequently spent a season at Droylsden, helping them win promotion to the Conference National, but decided to leave due to difficulties navigating from Shrewsbury where he had a plumbing business. To remain in Shropshire he signed a one-year deal with AFC Telford United of the Conference North after initiating a phonecall with their manager. It was followed by playing for Hednesford Town and Shropshire teams Ellesmere Rangers and Market Drayton.

Personal life
Of Polish and Scottish descent, he was the elder brother of Premier League footballer Phil Jagielka. After retiring from football, he worked for Caterpillar Inc. and for his own plumbing business. He was formerly married, to Jo Fallows, with whom he had three children.

On 17 March 2021, it was announced that Jagielka, who was living in Rodington, Shropshire, had died aged 43.

Career statistics

Honours
Accrington Stanley
Conference National: 2005–06

References

External links

1978 births
2021 deaths
People from Sale, Greater Manchester
Footballers from Greater Manchester
English footballers
Association football midfielders
Stoke City F.C. players
Shrewsbury Town F.C. players
Sheffield United F.C. players
Accrington Stanley F.C. players
Droylsden F.C. players
Market Drayton Town F.C. players
AFC Telford United players
Hednesford Town F.C. players
Ellesmere Rangers F.C. players
English Football League players
National League (English football) players
English people of Polish descent
English people of Scottish descent
Drug-related deaths in England